The first Government of Prime Minister Edi Rama was the 65th ruling Government of the Republic of Albania formed on 15 September 2013.

Following the 2013 election, the Socialist Party-led Alliance for a European Albania won a majority of seats to Parliament and formed the government. There is a record, six women in the government, which is a regional precedent as well. Rama said: "A team has been built with almost 90 percent of people sitting for the first time in the ministerial chair and probably with more women that all the governments of Albania have had all together in these 20 years."

Issues 

Amongst its first issues was a reshuffling of the domestic security infrastructure boost security and combat an increasing crime rate. In announcing the change, Rama said "We have inherited a security situation unthinkable for a country that is not in a state of war or armed conflict." The changes entailed a less centralised in order to be closer to the community. In this regard, the number of high-ranking officers was reduced from 811 to 255, the head of the General Directorate of Police Hysni Burgaj was replaced by former special forces commander Artan Didi and the heads of the police in the 12 administrative regions were also replaced, while units like the traffic police were disbanded.

Looking to gain membership to the European Union, it has gained the support of former British Prime Minister Tony Blair, he becoming an advisor to the government. It has also gained the support of the multiple EU governments to help propel it forward towards EU integration.

On 16 October 2013 the European Commission released its annual reports on prospective member states which concluded that the Albanian election was held in an "orderly manner" and that progress had been made in meeting other conditions and as such recommended granting Albania candidate status. On 5 December 2013 in an MEP meeting it was recommended that "...the Council should acknowledge the progress made by Albania by granting it candidate status without undue delay." However, several states, including Denmark and the Netherlands, remained opposed to granting Albania candidate status, and at a December 2013 meeting the Council of the European Union put off the decision until June 2014.

As done during his tenure as Mayor of Tirana, Rama stresses the modernization of public services and has started the process of modernizing and restoring customs and also employed the English "Crown Agents", to help reform the customs. Also done when mayor, the demolition of buildings by the NUCI, the National Urban Construction Institution, is an important matter for keeping the coast and Albania authentic.

Cabinet
The first Rama Government on the day he took office consisted of 19 ministers, not including the Prime Minister and the Deputy Prime Minister.

Notes

See also
 Politics of Albania
 Edi Rama

References

External links
 Council of Ministers Official website

G65
2013 establishments in Albania
Ministries established in 2013
Ministries disestablished in 2017
2017 disestablishments in Albania